Artacarus is a monotypic genus of hubbardiid short-tailed whipscorpions, first described by Orator F. Cook in 1899. Its single species, Artacarus liberiensis is distributed in Ivory Coast and Liberia.

References 

Schizomida genera
Monotypic arachnid genera